Alma River may refer to:

 Alma River (Manouane River), a tributary of Lac Saint-Jean in Quebec, in Canada
 Alma (Crimea)
 Alma River (New Zealand)
 Alma River (Australia), a 32 km tributary of Lyons River

See also
Almaș River (disambiguation)